Nii Station is the name of two train stations in Japan:

 Nii Station (Hyōgo) (新井駅)
 Nii Station (Mie) (新居駅)